Oswald Rothaug (17 May 1897  – 4 December 1967) was a Nazi jurist.

Life
Rothaug was born in Mittelsinn, Bavaria. In June 1933, Rothaug was named a prosecutor in Nuremberg, and in April 1937, he became the regional court director in Schweinfurt and director of Nazi "special courts" or "Sondergerichte" at Nuremberg. In 1938, he became a member of the German Nazi Party, though he had applied the previous year. He worked closely with the Sicherheitsdienst or intelligence apparatus of the Nazi SS.

In 1942, he sentenced a 25-year-old Polish slave labourer to death, explaining that "the inferiority of the defendant is clear as he is a part of Polish sub-humanity".

Rothaug sought after and presided over the trial of Leo Katzenberger in March 1942, ordering his execution for "racial defilement" in May 1943. Rothaug accused the elderly Jewish man of having sexual relations with a younger German woman, Irene Seiler, which was a crime in Nazi Germany according to the Rassenschande or "racial purity" laws, a part of the Nuremberg Laws. Both Katzenberger and Seiler denied the accusations. Following the trial, Rothaug was brought to Berlin as a member of the Nazi People's Court.

During the Judges' Trial at Nuremberg, Rothaug was sentenced to life imprisonment on 14 December 1947 for crimes against humanity. He was the only defendant to be convicted of crimes against humanity, but acquitted of war crimes. Nonetheless, the court commented in its judgment that:

His sentence was later reduced to 20 years, and he was released on parole on 22 December 1956.

Death
Rothaug died in Cologne on 4 December 1967, aged 70.

Cultural references
Rothaug's role in the Katzenberger trial was inspiration for the plot surrounding the fictional characters Ernst Janning and Irene Hoffman Wallner in the 1961 film Judgment at Nuremberg.

References

Bibliography
 Ernst Klee: Das Personenlexikon zum Dritten Reich. Wer war was vor und nach 1945? S. Fischer, Frankfurt am Main 2003, .
 Kohl, Christianne, "The Maiden and the Jew", Hoffman und Campe, Hamburg, 1997.

1897 births
1967 deaths
People from Main-Spessart
German people convicted of crimes against humanity
German prisoners sentenced to life imprisonment
Prisoners sentenced to life imprisonment by the United States military
People convicted by the United States Nuremberg Military Tribunals
Judges in the Nazi Party